The Egyptian Volleyball Cup began with 1976–77 season. It is organized by Egyptian Volleyball Federation. Clubs of all divisions takes part in this competition.

Titles

Performance by club

Notes

References

External links

 

Volleyball in Egypt